Quadrupedalism is a form of locomotion where four limbs are used to bear weight and move around. An animal or machine that usually maintains a four-legged posture and moves using all four limbs is said to be a quadruped (from Latin quattuor for "four", and pes, pedis for "foot"). Quadruped animals are found among both vertebrates and invertebrates.

Quadrupeds vs. tetrapods

Although the words ‘quadruped’ and ‘tetrapod’ are both derived from terms meaning ‘four-footed’, they have distinct meanings. A tetrapod is any member of the taxonomic unit Tetrapoda (which is defined by descent from a specific four-limbed ancestor), whereas a quadruped actually uses four limbs for locomotion. Not all tetrapods are quadrupeds and not all entities that could be described as ‘quadrupedal’ are tetrapods. This last meaning includes certain artificial objects; almost all quadruped organisms are tetrapods (with the exception of some raptorial arthropods adapted for four-footed locomotion, such as the Mantodea).

The distinction between quadrupeds and tetrapods is important in evolutionary biology, particularly in the context of tetrapods whose limbs have adapted to other roles (e.g., hands in the case of humans, wings in the case of birds and bats, and fins in the case of whales). All of these animals are tetrapods, but none is a quadruped. Even snakes, whose limbs have become vestigial or lost entirely, are, nevertheless, tetrapods.

In infants and for exercise 

Quadrupedalism is sometimes referred to as being "on all fours", and is observed in crawling, especially by infants.

In the 20th century quadrupedal movement was popularized as a form of physical exercise by Georges Hebert. Kenichi Ito is a Japanese man famous for speed running on four limbs.

Other human quadrupedalism

In July 2005, in rural Turkey, scientists discovered five Turkish siblings who had learned to walk naturally on their hands and feet. Unlike chimpanzees, which ambulate on their knuckles, the Ulas Family walked on their palms, allowing them to preserve the dexterity of their fingers.

Quadrupedal robots

BigDog is a dynamically stable quadruped robot created in 2005 by Boston Dynamics with Foster-Miller, the NASA Jet Propulsion Laboratory, and the Harvard University Concord Field Station.

Also by NASA JPL, in collaboration with University of California, Santa Barbara Robotics Lab, is RoboSimian, with emphasis on stability and deliberation. It has been demonstrated at the DARPA Robotics Challenge.

Pronograde posture 
A related concept to quadrupedalism is pronogrady, or having a horizontal posture of the trunk. Although nearly all quadrupedal animals are pronograde,  bipedal animals also have that posture, including many living birds and extinct dinosaurs.

Nonhuman apes with orthograde (vertical) backs may walk quadrupedally in what is called knuckle-walking.

References

External links
 Family may provide evolution clue - BBC News

Tetrapods
Terrestrial locomotion
Articles containing video clips
Pedalism